Henrik Nilsson (born 5 May 1991) is a Swedish professional ice hockey player, currently playing with Fehérvár AV19 in the ICE Hockey League (ICEHL). He played with AIK IF in the Elitserien during the 2010–11 Elitserien season.

After spending the 2018–19 season, with the Lahti Pelicans of the Finnish Liiga, Nilsson returned to the SHL as a free agent in signing a one-year contract with newly promoted IK Oskarshamn on 10 June 2019.

References

External links
 

1991 births
Almtuna IS players
AIK IF players
Dornbirn Bulldogs players
Fehérvár AV19 players
Karlskrona HK players
Living people
Lahti Pelicans players
IK Oskarshamn players
Ice hockey people from Stockholm
Swedish ice hockey defencemen